Manzini Wanderers is a professional Eswatini soccer club based in Manzini. It is one of the oldest premier league teams in the kingdom of Eswatini, that competes in the Premier League of Eswatini, the top tier of Swazi football. The club has won the league six times, Swazi Cup once, six times the Swazi Trade fair Cup and 3 times the Swazi Charity Cup. The club has been a mainstay of Swazi football for a long time and it is considered amongst the biggest teams in the country.

Achievements
Swazi Premier League: 6
 1983, 1985, 1987, 1999, 2002, 2003.

Swazi Cup: 1
 1984.

Swazi Charity Cup: 3
 2002, 2003, 2005.

Swazi Trade Fair Cup: 6
 1984, 1985, 1986, 1993, 1996, 2000.

Performance in CAF competitions
African Cup of Champions Clubs: 3 appearances
1984 – Preliminary Round
1986 – Preliminary Round
1988 – First Round

CAF Cup Winners' Cup: 1 appearance
1985 – First Round

Current squad

Former players

  Mlondi Mdluli

 
Football clubs in Eswatini
1957 establishments in Swaziland
Manzini, Eswatini